Ryan do Nascimento Ramos, known as Ryan (born 1 April 1992) is a Brazilian football player who plays for São Gonçalo.

Club career
He made his professional debut in the Campeonato Brasileiro Série A for Figueirense on 25 November 2012 in a game against Grêmio.

References

External links
 

1992 births
Footballers from Rio de Janeiro (city)
Living people
Brazilian footballers
Brazilian expatriate footballers
Figueirense FC players
Madureira Esporte Clube players
C.F. União players
Vila Nova Futebol Clube players
Itumbiara Esporte Clube players
Palmas Futebol e Regatas players
Liga Portugal 2 players
Campeonato Brasileiro Série A players
Campeonato Brasileiro Série C players
Campeonato Brasileiro Série D players
Association football midfielders
Brazilian expatriate sportspeople in Portugal
Expatriate footballers in Portugal